The 1993–94 Illinois Fighting Illini men's basketball team represented the University of Illinois.

Regular season
The 1993-94 season saw Illinois again advance to the NCAA tournament and in the process, senior Deon Thomas broke a 13-year-old record and became the school’s all-time leading scorer. Thomas scored his record-breaking 1,693rd point in the championship game of the Illini/Pepsi Classic against American University and he went on to finish his career with 2,129 points.  Also during this season, a young upstart freshman, Kiwane Garris, would begin his assault on the all-time scoring list. He notched 446 points as a freshman and would be the catalyst on the Illini team over the next few years.

Roster

Source

Schedule
												
Source																
												

|-
!colspan=12 style="background:#DF4E38; color:white;"| Non-Conference regular season

	

|-
!colspan=9 style="background:#DF4E38; color:#FFFFFF;"|Big Ten regular season

|-
!colspan=9 style="text-align: center; background:#DF4E38"|NCAA tournament	

|-

Player stats

Awards and honors
Deon Thomas
Associated Press Honorable Mention All-American 
Fighting Illini All-Century team (2005)
Team Most Valuable Player

Team players drafted into the NBA

Rankings

References

Illinois Fighting Illini
Illinois
Illinois Fighting Illini men's basketball seasons
1993 in sports in Illinois
1994 in sports in Illinois